Composr CMS (or Composr) is a web application for creating websites. It is a combination of a Web content management system and Online community (Social Networking) software. Composr is licensed as free software and primarily written in the PHP programming language.

Composr is available on various web application distributions platforms, including Installatron, Softaculous, Web Platform Installer and Bitnami.

History
Composr was launched in 2004 as ocPortal.

ocPortal was featured on the CMS Report (a CMS editorial website) "Top 30 Web Applications" list.

ocPortal was developed up until version 9 and renamed to Composr CMS in 2016 alongside the new version 10 as a product and branding overhaul.

Features
The main features are for:

 Content Management of website structure and pages
 Content Management of custom content types ("Catalogues")
 Galleries (Photos and Videos)
 News and Blogging
 Discussion Forums
 Chat Rooms
 Advertising management ("Banners")
 Calendars
 File management ("Downloads")
 wikis ("Wiki+")
 Quizzes
 Newsletters
 Community Points

Composr uses a number of built-in languages to build up web content and structure, mainly:

 Comcode (for creating high-level web content, similar to BBCode)
 Tempcode (a templating language)
 Filtercode (for defining content filtering)
 Selectcode (for defining content selection)

Composr is developed distinctly compared to most other Open Source CMSs, with the main distinctions being:
 Composr is module-orientated, rather than node-orientated
 Common software components are designed for maximum integration, rather than maximum choice
 Composr is sponsored by a commercial software company, rather than being volunteer led

Some unique (or rare) features of Composr are:
 Automatic banning of hackers (if hacking attempts are detected)
 Core integration with spammer block lists
 Integration with third-party forum software for user accounts and forums (although this is no longer a focus)
 Automatic color scheme generation using color theory
 ATAG compliance

Criticisms
Composr's primary weak point has been noted as its relatively small community. Few community addons or themes have been released for Composr when compared to projects such as Drupal and Wordpress. Some Composr fans argue that the number of built-in features is both the reason and the solution for the lack of popular third party addons.

See also
 List of content management systems

References

External links

WordPress Web Design
WordPress Speed Optimization

Blog software
2004 software
Website management
Cross-platform software
Content management systems
Free content management systems
Free software programmed in PHP